Atli Sveinn Þórarinsson (born 24 January 1980) is a  Icelandic football coach and former player who played as a defender for KA, Valur and Örgryte.

Club career
Atli Sveinn started his senior team career with KA before going on to play for Örgryte IS and Valur. He finished out his career by playing in the Icelandic Cup with Nökkvi and Ármann.

National team career
Atli Sveinn debuted for the national team in 2002.

Managerial career
Atli Sveinn started his manager career with Dalvík/Reynir in 2016. He was later the manager of Fylkir from 2020 to 2021 with Ólafur Stígsson. In September 2021, he was hired as the manager of Haukar.

References

External links
 
 

1980 births
Living people
Atli Sveinn Thorarinsson
Atli Sveinn Thorarinsson
Atli Sveinn Thorarinsson
Atli Sveinn Thorarinsson
Atli Sveinn Thorarinsson
Örgryte IS players
Atli Sveinn Thorarinsson
Atli Sveinn Thorarinsson
Atli Sveinn Thorarinsson
Allsvenskan players
Expatriate footballers in Sweden
Association football defenders